is a former Japanese football player.

Playing career
Yuki Kikumoto joined to Renofa Yamaguchi FC in 2014. In 2016, he moved to Briobecca Urayasu.

References

External links

1993 births
Living people
Chukyo University alumni
Association football people from Yamaguchi Prefecture
Japanese footballers
J3 League players
Japan Football League players
Renofa Yamaguchi FC players
Briobecca Urayasu players
Association football defenders
Japanese expatriate footballers
Japanese expatriate sportspeople in Portugal
Expatriate footballers in Portugal